Poison 2 is a 2020 Indian Hindi-language action crime thriller web series that is streaming on ZEE5.  directed by Vishal Pandya and produced by Panorama Entertainmanet & Bombay Media Works. Poison 2 casts Aftab Shivdasani, Raai Laxmi, Pooja Chopra, Zain Imam and Vin Rana in lead roles. This is the first digital debut of Aftab Shivdasani and Raai Laxmi.

Its initial release date was 30 April 2020, but due to the COVID-19 pandemic it got postponed. The trailer of the series was released on 29 September 2020. and the series premiered on 16 October 2020 on ZEE5.

Synopsis
Aditya, helped by Hina, is back to take revenge from the Josh team i.e. Sara, Harsh and Oscar. The series brings together a plot of revenge filled with deceit, passion, rage, and redemption as well as love, trust, friendship, truthfulness, honesty and camaraderie.

Cast 

 Aftab Shivdasani as Aditya Singh Rathore
 Raai Laxmi as Sara Matthews Oberoi
 Pooja Chopra as Isha Khanna
 Rahul Dev as Sikander Malik (Cameo) 
 Vin Rana as Oscar Matthews
 Zain Imam as Harshvardhan Oberoi
 Asmita Sood as Hina Malik
 Karan Veer Mehra as Jaiveer Khanna (Cameo) 
 Joy Sengupta as Home Secretary
 Pawan Chopra as Commissioner Arvind Bhonsle
 Deepak Chadha as Saurabh Khanna
 Gaurav Sharma as Pawan
 Taher Shabbir as Tony Secuira
 Sakshi Pradhan as Rani
 Faizal Rashid as Nandu
 Tanuj Virwani as Ranveer (Special Appearance)

Episodes

References

External links
 
 Poison 2  on ZEE5

Indian drama web series
Thriller web series
Crime web series
ZEE5 original programming
2020 web series debuts